Per Christensen (18 July 1934 – 26 August 2009) was a Norwegian actor. His film credits include Elling, Hotel Cæsar, The Warrior's Heart, and The Passionate Demons.

Selected filmography
 1957: Slalåm under himmelen
 1958: I slik en natt as a railway employee
 1961: Det store varpet as Ola
 1973: Lina's Wedding
 1987: Over grensen as the defense attorney
 2001: Elling as Alfons Jørgensen

References

External links

1934 births
2009 deaths
Norwegian male film actors